The 1960–61 season was Newport County's third consecutive season in the Football League Third Division since the end of regionalisation in 1958. It was their 32nd season in the third tier and 33rd competitive season overall in the Football League.

Season review

Results summary

Results by round

Fixtures and results

Third Division

FA Cup

Football League Cup

Welsh Cup

League table

External links
 Newport County 1960-1961 : Results
 Newport County football club match record: 1961
 Welsh Cup 1960/61

References

 Amber in the Blood: A History of Newport County. 

1960-61
English football clubs 1960–61 season
1960–61 in Welsh football